Australia is participating in the 2019 Summer Universiade, in Naples, Italy with 167 competitors in 14 sports.

References

External links
Universiade Napoli 2019

Nations at the 2019 Summer Universiade
Australia at the Summer Universiade
2019 in Australian sport